Old Hilltown, formerly Hill Town, is an unincorporated community in Monterey County, California.
The name is from James Bryant Hill, one of the first settler in the area.
The first European land exploration of Alta California, the Spanish Portolá expedition, camped on the Salinas River in this vicinity on September 30, 1769, having followed the river from the south for several days. From this camp, the scouts went out to survey the route ahead and saw Monterey Bay for the first time. Unsure whether the point they could see at the southern end of the bay was the "Point of Pines" described by Sebastian Vizcaino in 1602, Portola decided that the party should investigate.

Hill Town was established at a ford of the Salinas River called Paso del Quinto. Hill Town was the site of one of the first ferries on the Salinas River. The ferry operated until 1889 when a bridge was built across the river. The site is now registered as California Historical Landmark #560.

Government
At the county level, Old Hilltown is represented on the Monterey County Board of Supervisors by Supervisor Dave Potter.

In the United States House of Representatives, Hilltown is in

References

Unincorporated communities in Monterey County, California
Salinas River (California)
Salinas Valley
Unincorporated communities in California